Nadezda "Nadia" Kanaeva (born 9 February 1982) is a Russian former competitive figure skater. She is the 1997 Nebelhorn Trophy bronze medalist, 1996 World Junior bronze medalist, and 1995 European Youth Olympic champion. She was coached by Elena Buianova.

As of 2020, Kanaeva worked as a skating coach at Lakewood ICE in Lakewood, California, assisting Rafael Arutyunyan.

Competitive highlights 
JGP: Junior Grand Prix (also titled ISU Junior Series)

References 

1982 births
Russian female single skaters
Living people
World Junior Figure Skating Championships medalists
Figure skaters from Moscow
Russian emigrants to the United States